The Kingston Colonials were an American basketball team based in Kingston, New Jersey that was a member of the American Basketball League.

During the 1939/40 season, the team was merged into the Troy Celtics on December 19, 1939.

Year-by-year

Basketball teams in New Jersey
Basketball teams established in 1935
Sports clubs disestablished in 1940
1938 establishments in New Jersey
1941 disestablishments in New Jersey